Line M12, officially referred to as the M12 Göztepe-Ataşehir-Ümraniye line, is a proposed rapid transit line of the Istanbul Metro system, currently under construction in the Asian part of Istanbul, Turkey.

The travel time between the end stations will be 26 minutes. It is expected that it will carry hourly around 35,000 riders in one direction. The line will run through three districts of Istanbul, namely Kadıköy, Ataşehir and Ümraniye. It will connect to other rapid transit lines at Tütüncü Mehmet Efendi station to Marmaray, at Yenisahra to M4 Kadıköy–Sabiha Gökçen Airport, and at Çarşı to M5 Üsküdar–Çekmeköy.

The investment budget of the construction is  2.376 billion (approx. US$670 million). The construction of the metro began with work at the end station 60. Yıl Parkı in August 2017. The tender of this project was canceled on 3 January 2018.

The new mayor Ekrem İmamoğlu announced that the metropolitan municipality restarted the construction works. The line is expected to be operational in 2024.

Stations  
1 60. Yıl Parkı  İETT Bus 4, 16, 16D, ER1, ER2, FB1, FB2, GZ1, GZ2

2 Tütüncü Mehmet Efendi  (Göztepe)  İETT Bus 4, 16, 16D, ER1, ER2, FB1, FB2, GZ1, GZ2

3 Sahrayıcedit  İETT Bus 2, 8E, 9K, 10B, 10E, 10G, 14AK, 14B, 14CE, 14ES, 14Y, 14ÇK, 14ŞB, 15SK, 15YK, 15ÇK, 17, 17L, 19ES, 19F, 19K, 19M, 19S, 19Y, 20D, 20K, ER1, ER2, FB1, FB2, GZ1, GZ2

4 Yenisahra   İETT Bus 8A, 8Y

5 Ataşehir  İETT Bus 8A, 8K, 8Y, 10A, 13, 13AB, 16M, 19FS, 256, KM46

6 Finans Merkezi  (Project)  İETT Bus 8K, 8Y, 11M, 13B, 13H, 13M, 13Y, 14BK 19FS, 20D

7 Site  (Project)・ İETT Bus 8K, 8Y, 11M, 13B, 13H, 13M, 19FS, 20D

8 Atakent  İETT Bus 9A, 10G, 11M, 13AB, 14B, 20Ü

9 Çarşı   İETT Bus 7, 9A, 10, 11D, 11K, 11P, 11V, 13, 13B, 13H, 14, 14B, 14DK, 14E, 14ES, 14YE, 15B, 19D, 20, 131, 131A, 131B, 131T, 131TD, 131Ü, 131YS, 138, 138B, 139, 139A, 139D, 139S, 320, 522

10 SBÜ Hastanesi  İETT Bus 7, 9, 9K, 9T, 10, 10G, 11, 11A, 11ÇB, 11K, 11P, 11ST, 11ÜS, 13H, 14D, 14E, 14K, 14YK, 15B, 15BK, 15TK, 15TY, 20, 20K, MR9

11 Kâzım Karabekir  İETT Bus 7, 11K, 11ST, 14E, 14K, 15B, 15YK 20K

References

Istanbul Metro
Transport infrastructure under construction in Turkey
Transport in Kadıköy
Ataşehir
Ümraniye